The Hetrodinae are a subfamily of robust bush crickets, also known as armoured katydids, corn crickets, etc. (Orthoptera: Ensifera) currently including five tribes.

Distribution 
The subfamily is endemic to Africa and adjacent areas of the Arabian Peninsula.

Tribes and genera
The subfamily consists of the following tribes and genera:

Acanthoplini
Authority: Ebner 1964

 Acanthoplus Stål, 1873
 Cloanthella Bolívar, 1890

Anepisceptini
Authority: Schmidt, G.H. 1998
 Anepisceptus Fieber, 1853
 Weidnerius Schmidt, 1998

Enyaliopsini
Authority: Weidner 1955
 Cosmoderus Lucas, 1868
 Enyaliopsis Karsch, 1887
 Gymnoproctus Karsch, 1887
 Hemihetrodes Pictet, 1888

Eugastrini
Authority: Karsch 1887
 Acanthoproctus Karsch, 1887
 Bradyopisthius Karsch, 1887
 Eugaster Serville, 1838
 Eugasteroides Weidner, 1955
 Spalacomimus Karsch, 1887

Hetrodini
Authority: Brunner von Wattenwyl 1878
 Hetrodes Fischer von Waldheim, 1833

References

External links

Tettigoniidae
Orthoptera subfamilies